Johan Björk (born August 28, 1984) is a Swedish professional ice hockey defenseman who last played for IK Pantern.

He was selected by the Ottawa Senators in the 4th round (125th overall) of the 2002 NHL Entry Draft after establishing himself at his original local club, Malmö Redhawks of the then Elitserien.
Björk plays pretty secure defense, but can contribute offensively as well. He is a rather tough defenseman and plays a good physical game. Björk, who is quite agile and mobile, has also a good release and he passes the puck well.

On June 6, 2014, Björk left Malmö of the HockeyAllsvenskan for a second time, in agreeing to a one-year contract with Austrian club, HC TWK Innsbruck of the EBEL. He returned to the Redhawks later in the season, and helped the club gain promotion to the SHL.

Career statistics

Regular season and playoffs

International

References

External links

Living people
1984 births
HK Acroni Jesenice players
HV71 players
HC TWK Innsbruck players
IK Pantern players
Lukko players
Malmö Redhawks players
Ottawa Senators draft picks
Swedish ice hockey defencemen
Sportspeople from Malmö